The 159th Fighter Wing (159 FW) is a unit of the Louisiana Air National Guard, stationed at Naval Air Station Joint Reserve Base New Orleans, Louisiana. If activated to federal service, the Wing is gained by the United States Air Force Air Combat Command.

The 122d Fighter Squadron, assigned to the Wings 159th Operations Group, is a descendant organization of the 122d Observation Squadron, established on 30 July 1940. It is one of the 29 original National Guard Observation Squadrons of the United States Army National Guard formed before World War II.

Overview
The 159th Fighter Wing, nicknamed "The Bayou Militia," is an Air National Guard F-15C Eagle fighter unit located at NAS JRB New Orleans, Louisiana. The 159th Fighter Wing is tasked with providing air superiority over Louisiana and the Gulf Coast while supporting USNORTHCOM and NORAD (North American Aerospace Defense Command).

The title "Coonass Militia" was changed to "Cajun Militia" in 1992, and subsequently changed to "Bayou Militia" in the late 1990s.

The LA ANG use Warning Area airspace over the Gulf of Mexico for most of their training. Supersonic flight, necessary for realistic training, is conducted away from the shoreline in a manner that does not disturb the public. Some forms of chaff, however, do interfere electronically with the Houston FAA ARTCC.

159th Fighter Wing/Louisiana Air National Guard was awarded the "Outstanding Air National Guard Unit" in 2003. This award is given annually to the Air National Guard unit which meets or exceeds the criteria from the National Guard Bureau.

Units
The 159th Fighter Wing consists of the following units:
 159th Operations Group
 122d Fighter Squadron
 159th Maintenance Group
 159th Mission Support Group
 159th Medical Group
 214th Engineering & Installation Squadron
 236th Combat Communications Squadron (GSU at Hammond LA)
 259th Air Traffic Control Squadron (GSU at Alexandria LA)
 122d Air Support Operations Squadron (GSU at Pineville LA)

History

In 1958, the Louisiana Air National Guard 122d Fighter-Interceptor Squadron was authorized to expand to a group level, and the 159th Fighter Interceptor Group was established by the National Guard Bureau on 1 April 1958. The 122d FIS becoming the group's flying squadron. Other support squadrons assigned into the group were the 159th Headquarters, 159th Material Squadron (Maintenance), 159th Combat Support Squadron, and the 159th USAF Dispensary.  The 122d FIS was equipped with the F-86L Sabre Interceptor.

Air Defense mission
With the F-86L, the squadron stood a runway alert program on full 24-hour basis – with armed jet fighters ready to "scramble" at a moment's notice. This event brought the 159th into the daily combat operational program of the USAF, placing it on "the end of the runway" alongside regular USAF-Air Defense Fighter Squadrons.

In July 1960, the 159th converted to the F-102 Delta Daggers. In 1962, the 122d Fighter-Interceptor Squadron was assigned to the Gulfport Combat Readiness Training Center, Mississippi, for six weeks of intensive flying training. Involved were 150 officers and airmen, including support elements from the 159th Consolidated Aircraft Maintenance Squadron, 159th Material Squadron and 159th Air Base Squadron.

Tactical Air Command

In December 1970 the 159th was transferred from Aerospace Defense Command to Tactical Air Command.  ADC was phasing down its manned interceptor force as the chances of a Soviet Bomber attack on the United States seemed remote.   The unit was re-designated the 159th Tactical Fighter Group, and the 122d Tactical Fighter Squadron was re-equipped with F-100D/F Super Sabres.   In 1970, the F-100 was still considered a first-line aircraft, and most of the F-100s in the inventory were serving in South Vietnam flying combat missions.  The Super Sabres received by the 122d came from the USAFE 20th Tactical Fighter Wing which was transitioning to the General Dynamics F-111F.    With the conversion to the F-100s, the ADC 24-hour alert status ended and retraining in tactical fighter missions began.

The 159th flew the F-100s for almost a decade, retiring the aircraft beginning in April 1979 when the 122d began receiving F-4C Phantom II aircraft from active-duty units.   In 1979 Aerospace Defense Command was inactivated, with Tactical Air Command taking over the Continental US Air Defense Mission. The 159th was assigned to Air Defense, Tactical Air Command (ADTAC), a named unit at the Numbered Air Force level under TAC.  Under ADTAC, the 122d began to fly Air Defense missions again with the F-4C, although the squadron was dual-hatted and continued to fly Tactical Fighter training missions with the Phantom.

The Phantoms were ending their service life in the mid-1980s, and in 1986, the F-4Cs were replaced by F-15A/B Eagles.   As the F-15s had no tactical bombing capability at the time, the 122d continued the Air Defense mission under TAC.

Modern era
In March 1992 the 159th Tactical Fighter Group became the 159th Fighter Group when the unit adopted the USAF Objective Organization, and the 122d Fighter Squadron was assigned to the new 159th Operations Group.   Later in June, Tactical Air Command stood down and was replaced by Air Combat Command (ACC).   No change in mission was made and the 159th continued in the air defense role.

In the early 1990s, squadron aircraft and personnel were deployed to Aviano Air Base, Italy, flying combat missions over the former Yugoslavia during the Kosovo War as part of Operation Allied Force.  On 11 October 1995, in accordance with the "one base-one wing" policy, the 159th Fighter Group was changed in status and was re-designated as the 159th Fighter Wing.

In mid-1996, the Air Force, in response to budget cuts, and changing world situations, began experimenting with Air Expeditionary organizations. The Air Expeditionary Force (AEF) concept was developed that would mix Active-Duty, Reserve and Air National Guard elements into a combined force. Instead of entire permanent units deploying as "Provisional" as in the 1991 Gulf War, Expeditionary units are composed of "aviation packages" from several wings, including active-duty Air Force, the Air Force Reserve Command and the Air National Guard, would be married together to carry out the assigned deployment rotation.

In the late 1990s, the 122d Expeditionary Fighter Squadron was activated on several occasions, sending packages of personnel and aircraft Incirlik Air Base, Turkey, to fly Combat Air Patrol missions over Iraq as part of Operation Northern Watch.  Also the 122d EFS was activated with a deployment to Prince Sultan Air Base, Saudi Arabia, flying CAP missions over Southern Iraq as part of Operation Southern Watch.  On 25 June 1999, members of the 159th Fighter Wing, New Orleans ANG, while on deployment to NAS Keflavik, Iceland, flying F-15A aircraft, intercepted two Russian TU-95 "Bear-H" aircraft.

In response to the 9/11 attacks in 2001, the 122d Fighter Squadron engaged in Combat Air Patrols over major United States Cities as part of Operation Noble Eagle (ONE).   ONE patrols continued into 2002 before being scaled down.

In 2006, the F-15A models were retired and the 122d was upgraded to the more capable F-15C Eagle.  As part of the Global War on Terrorism, the 122d EFS has been deployed to support Operation Iraqi Freedom (OIF); Operation Enduring Freedom (OEF) in Afghanistan, Operation New Horizons in Central and South America and Operation New Dawn in Afghanistan.

The most recent deployment of the 122d Expeditionary Fighter Squadron was completed in October 2012 when the squadron deployed to at Al Dhafra Air Base, United Arab Emirates, and as part of the 380th Expeditionary Operations Group, the 122d EFS flew missions in support of the Joint Air Defense of the Persian Gulf and Operation Enduring Freedom. The mission included providing air superiority in support of national military objectives and flying Fighter Integration Sorties with F-22 Raptors and F-15E Strike Eagles.

BRAC 2005 Recommendations
In its 2005 BRAC Recommendations, the Department of Defense recommended to realign the 142d Fighter Wing (ANG) at Portland IAP AGS, Oregon, by distributing the wing's F-15 aircraft to the 159th Fighter Wing (ANG), New Orleans ARS, Louisiana (nine aircraft) and another installation. New Orleans had above average military value for reserve component bases, and realigning aircraft from Portland would create another optimum-sized fighter squadron at New Orleans. By relocating the geographically separated Air National Guard squadron onto New Orleans, the Air Force would best utilize available facilities on the installation while reducing the cost to the government to lease facilities in the community. However, the Pentagon's recommendation was rejected by the BRAC Commission and the 142d Fighter Wing ended up gaining three more aircraft in the process.

Lineage

 Designated 159th Fighter Group (Air Defense), and allotted to Louisiana ANG, in 1958
 Extended federal recognition on 1 March 1958
 Re-designated: 159th Tactical Fighter Group, 5 December 1970
 Re-designated: 159th Fighter Group, 15 March 1992
 Status changed from Group to Wing, 11 October 1995
 Re-designated: 159th Fighter Wing, 11 October 1995

Assignments
 136th Air Defense Wing, 1 March 1958
 Louisiana Air National Guard, 30 August 1961
 Gained by: Montgomery Air Defense Sector, Air Defense Command
 Gained by: 32d Air Division, Air Defense Command, 1 April 1966
 Gained by: 32d Air Division, Aerospace Defense Command, 15 January 1968
 Gained by: Tactical Air Command, 5 December 1970
 Gained by: Air Combat Command, 1 June 1992

Components
 159th Operations Group, 15 March 1992 – Present
 122d Fighter-Interceptor (late Tactical Fighter, Fighter) Squadron, 1 March 1958 – Present

Stations
 NAS New Orleans (later NAS-JRB), Louisiana, 1 March 1958 – present

Aircraft

 F-86L Sabre Interceptor, 1958–1960
 TF/F-102A Delta Dagger, 1960–1970
 F-100D/F Super Sabre, 1970–1979
 F-4C Phantom II, 1979–1985

 F-15A/B Eagle, 1985–2006
 Lockheed WC-130H, 1989 – 2007
 F-15C/D Eagle, 2006–present

Decorations
 Outstanding Unit Award

References

 122d Fighter Squadron history
 159th Fighter Wing history

External links

 Time Magazine Article on the 159th Fighter Group

Wings of the United States Air National Guard
159
Military units and formations in Louisiana